The fynbos golden mole (Amblysomus corriae) is a species of mammal in the golden mole family, Chrysochloridae. It is endemic to South Africa.

Its natural habitats are fynbos vegetation, temperate forests, shrubland, and grassland, subtropical or tropical lowland moist forest and dry grassland, moist savanna, sandy shores, arable land, pastureland, plantations, rural gardens, and urban areas.

See also
 Biodiversity of Cape Town
 Index: Fynbos - habitats and species.

References

Afrosoricida
Endemic fauna of South Africa
Mammals of South Africa
Fynbos
Taxonomy articles created by Polbot
Mammals described in 1905
Taxa named by Oldfield Thomas